MV Indiana Harbor is a very large diesel-powered lake freighter owned and operated by the American Steamship Company. This vessel was built in 1979 at Bay Shipbuilding Company, Sturgeon Bay, Wisconsin and included self-unloading technology.

Service history
In May 1984, Indiana Harbor was the largest ship to ever enter the harbor at Ludington, Michigan and delivered 45,000 tons of limestone to Ludington's Dow plant. It also set another record the following year with 50,090 tons of limestone. In August 1986, Indiana Harbor broke the Lake Erie record for loading coal, 52,000 tons, at Toledo, Ohio. Ten days later, Indiana Harbor ran aground in the St. Clair River.

On September 8, 1993, the ship collided with the Lansing Shoals Light Station. There were no injuries and the damage was about $1.9 million for the ship and $100,000 for the light. On January 3, 1996, Indiana Harbor grounded in the St. Marys River and suffered an  gash in the port bow.

References 

1979 ships
Great Lakes freighters
Ships built in Sturgeon Bay, Wisconsin